Premier rendez-vous (US title: Her First Affair) is a 1941 French comedy film starring Danielle Darrieux.  It was directed by Henri Decoin, who co-wrote the screenplay with Michel Duran. During the German occupation, the film was made by Continental Films at Paris Studios Cinéma.

Plot
An orphan girl corresponds with a lonely college professor. In the end, she falls in love with his nephew.

Cast 
 Danielle Darrieux : Micheline
 Louis Jourdan : Pierre
 Fernand Ledoux : Nicolas Rougemont
 Jean Tissier : Roland
 Gabrielle Dorziat : La directrice de l'orphelinat
 Sophie Desmarets : Henriette
 Rosine Luguet : Angèle
 Suzanne Dehelly : Christophine
 Jean Parédès : De Vatremont
 Georges Mauloy : Le directeur
 Daniel Gélin : Chauveau-Laplace
 Georges Marchal : De Vaugelas
 Annette Poivre : Une pensionnaire
 Simone Valère : Une pensionnaire
 Jacques Charon : Un collégien
 Jacques Dacqmine : Un collégien 
 Marcel Maupi
 Jean Négroni
 Robert Rollis

The first film dubbed in Persian
This is the first movie dubbed in Persian in 1946.

External links

Premier rendez-vous at filmsdefrance.com
Premier rendez-vous at Cinema-francais.fr
Premier Rendez-vous at TCMDB

1941 films
French black-and-white films
1941 romantic comedy films
French romantic comedy films
1940s French-language films
Continental Films films
1940s French films